"Tsunami" is a song by the Southern All Stars, released as their forty-fourth single on January 26, 2000.

Overview
The song was the first number-one single for Southern All Stars since the 1996 single Ai no Kotodama on the Oricon weekly charts. The band used the style of hard rock on the previous single "Yellow Man," which was released in March 1999. However, it only managed to reach the number-ten position on Oricon charts. Therefore, they returned to Japanese pop. The song sold over 654,000 copies in the first week and debuted at number-one, beating out Morning Musume's "Koi no Dance Site" on the Oricon weekly charts. The song once spent two weeks at the number-one position, lost one week to B'z's "Kon'ya Tsuki no Mieru Oka ni", and reached the number-one position again for three weeks, before being dethrone by KinKi Kids's "Suki ni Natteku Aishiteku/KinKi no Yaruki Manman Song" in week 7 of the release. It sold over 2.9 million copies and became the best selling single for the band. In June 2005, it became the third best-selling single on the Oricon chart, surpassing the sales of "Dango 3 Kyodai".

The song was included in their greatest hits album Ballad 3: The Album Of Love, released on November 22, 2000. The album debuted at the number-one position on the Oricon weekly charts, selling over 1.36 million copies within only one week.

The song resurrected the band. The song won the "Song of The Year" award at the 14th Japan Gold Disc Award. It also won the grand prix award at the 42nd Japan Record Awards.

Cover versions
The song was remade by South Korean singer V.One in 2003 with the title "그런가봐요" with Korean lyrics. The song became his breakout single after years of struggling for success and became one of his only hit songs. A variation of the cover was later sung by girl group AOA's member Choa, with piano accompaniment by You Hee-yeol, for the third episode of the first season of JTBC Entertainment's program Two Yoo Project Sugar Man, a music program intended to revitalize songs from artists considered as one-hit wonders by recreating their most well-known songs.

A cover version was recorded and released by the American band Allister in their 2006 album Guilty Pleasures. An instrumental cover version was made by Megadeth's former guitarist Marty Friedman, and featured on his 2009 solo album Tokyo Jukebox. Debbie Gibson recorded an English-language cover of the song in her 2010 Japan-only release Ms. Vocalist.

Track listing
 Tsunami (written by Keisuke Kuwata)
 Toryanse (written by Keisuke Kuwata)

See also
Southern All Stars discography

References

2000 singles
Rock ballads
Oricon Weekly number-one singles
Victor Entertainment singles